Adam le Rede (fl. 1301) was an English politician.

He was a Member (MP) of the Parliament of England for Derby in 1301 and 1314.

References

13th-century births
14th-century deaths
English MPs 1301
English MPs 1314